The Scolanova Synagogue (Judeo-Italian for new synagogue)

is a medieval synagogue in Trani, Italy. It was built as a synagogue in the 13th century, confiscated by the church during a wave of antisemitism around the year 1380, and converted for use as a church known as Santa Maria in Scolanova. In 2006, the building was deconsecrated by the Church and returned to its original use.

History

By 1541 all of the four synagogues in Trani had been converted to churches and the 310 Jews remaining in the city forcibly converted to Christianity. The four confiscated synagogues were renamed Santa Maria in Scolanova, San Leonardo Abate, San Pietro Martire, and Santi Quirico e Giovita (since renamed Sant'Anna), which was once the Scolagrande synagogue. San Pietro was later demolished. A plaque still visible on the northern wall of Sant'Anna explains that it was built on the site of a demolished synagogue in 1247. San Leonardo has undergone such extensive renovation that little of the synagogue building survives.

In 2006 the Scolanova Synagogue, which had been standing as an empty and disused church since the 1950s, was de-consecrated and returned to the Jewish community. The individuals principally responsible for the reconsecration of the synagogue were Professor and Mrs. Francesco Lotoro, descendants of Italian Anusim. Professor Lotoro is a pianist and conductor, who had studied the music of the Nazi concentration camps. The community now includes descendants of Neofiti (Italian crypto-Jews) and San Nicandro Jews.

A very old oil painting of St. Mary hangs in the niche that once held the Torah ark. The Church has refused to allow the painting to be moved to another church or to a museum. Moreover, the building is a protected historic site, so the Jewish congregation is not allowed to move the painting. The solution has been to hang a large image of a menorah in front of the painting.

Architecture

The synagogue was converted for use as a church without significant alterations being made to the interior of the building. The Gothic synagogue is a rectangular, masonry building, 49 by 21 feet. The barrel-vaulted ceiling is 36 feet high. There are three windows in the eastern wall, one on each side of the Torah Ark, and one above it.

The cut-stone surround for the Torah ark still exists. The ark was once reached by a flight of seven steps. It featured a central column that divided two separate arched openings.
The building next door once contained the synagogue's women's gallery and, in the basement, the stairs and pool of the medieval mikveh which survive.

References

Sources

External links
http://www.jewishitaly.org/detail.asp?ID=254
https://www.flickr.com/groups/synagogues/discuss/72157594418164779/
https://web.archive.org/web/20130828181737/http://charlesborlam.com/synagogue_in_trani.htm

Buildings and structures in Trani
Conversion of non-Christian religious buildings and structures into churches
Gothic architecture in Apulia
Romanesque and Gothic synagogues
13th-century synagogues
Synagogues in Italy
Italki Jews topics